The Lycée Condorcet is a school founded in 1803 in Paris, France, located at 8, rue du Havre, in the city's 9th arrondissement. It is one of the four oldest high schools in Paris and also one of the most prestigious. Since its inception, various political eras have seen it given a number of different names, but its identity today honors the memory of the Marquis de Condorcet. The school provides secondary education as part of the French education system. Henri Bergson, Horace Finaly, Claude Lévi-Strauss, Marcel Proust, Francis Poulenc and Paul Verlaine are some of the students who attended the Lycée Condorcet.

Some of the school's famous teachers include Jean Beaufret, Paul Bénichou, Jean-Marie Guyau, Jean-Paul Sartre, and Stéphane Mallarmé.

History

During the greater part of the nineteenth century, the school was the "great Liberal High School" on the right bank with its relatively flexible regime that was chosen by the progressive bourgeoisie for its sons. It is among the few schools in Paris that never had students as boarders: students who were not living with their parents worked, ate and slept in the neighbourhood via a network of "maitres de pension". The mix has gradually emerged in 1924 for preparatory classes for the grandes écoles, and 1975 for secondary classes.

Over the course of its history the school has changed name several times:

 Lycée de la Chaussée d’Antin (1804)
 Lycée impérial Bonaparte (1805 – 1814)
 Collège royal de Bourbon (July 1815 – February 1848)
 Lycée impérial Bonaparte (1848 – 1870)
 Lycée Condorcet (22 October 1870 – 1874)
 Lycée Fontane (1 May 1874 – 27 January 1883)
 Lycée Condorcet (since 1883)

Preparatory classes are also very old and were treated to famous teachers such as Jean-Paul Sartre.

Academics

Reputation and rankings

Notable teachers

Notable alumni

 Abdoulaye Wade
 Alain Frontier
 Alain Gillot-Petré
 Alain Krivine
 Albert Lautman
 Albert-Marie de Monléon
 Alexandre Dumas fils
 Alexandre Stavisky
 Alexandre-Théodore Brongniart
 Alfred Grosser
 André Antoine
 André Siegfried
 Anne Chopinet
 Antoine Charma
 Aurélien Lugné, dit Lugné-Poe
 Barbara Cassin
 Bernard Blier
 Carlos Raúl Villanueva
 Charles Augustin Sainte-Beuve
 Charles de Montalembert
 Christophe Bourseiller
 Claude Lévi-Strauss
 Clémence Ramnoux
 Daniel Buren
 Daniel Halévy
 David Kessler
 Dominique Lapierre
 Edmond de Goncourt
 Édouard Brézin
 Édouard de Rothschild
 Edouard Drumont
 Édouard Vuillard
 Édouard-Alfred Martel
 Émile Javal
 Émile Taufflieb
 Emmanuel d'Astier de la Vigerie
 Eric Walter, dit Hector Obalk
 Etienne Guyon
 Eugène Labiche
 Eugène Lefèvre-Pontalis
 Eugène Sue
 Fabien Lévy
 Félix d'Hérelle
 Félix Nadar
 Ferdinand Buisson
 Ferdinand Walsin Esterhazy
 Francis Poulenc
 Geneviève Rodis-Lewis
 Georges Perros
 Georges Vésier
 Gérard Gachet
 Gilbert Cesbron
 Gilbert Grandval
 Gustave Bloch
 Guy de Rothschild
 Henri Cartier-Bresson
 Henri de Toulouse-Lautrec
 Henri Hauser
 Henri Langlois
 Henri Pescarolo
 Henri Rabaud
 Henri Schneider
 Hippolyte Taine
 Horace Finaly
 Jacques Copeau
 Jacques de Reinach
 Jacques Dutronc
 Jacques Laurent
 Jean Balladur
 Jean Béraud
 Jean Cocteau
 Jean de Baroncelli
 Jean Dieudonné
 Jean Hugo
 Jean Marais
 Jean Nohain
 Jean-Barthélemy Hauréau
 Jean-Claude Delafon
 Jean-Claude Trichet
 Jean-Dominique Bauby
 Jean-Louis Crémieux-Brilhac
 Jean-Luc Marion
 Jean-Pierre Ceytaire
 Joseph Caillaux
 Joseph Reinach
 Jules de Goncourt
 Jules Laforgue
 Jules Vallès
 Ker-Xavier Roussel
 Laurent Broomhead
 Léon Brunschvicg
 Léon Noël
 Louis-François-Clement Breguet
 Les trois frères Reinach :Joseph, Salomon  et  Théodore 
 Madeleine Michelis
 Marcel Brillouin
 Marcel Cohen
 Maurice Denis
 Maxime Le Forestier
 Michel Dubost
 Michel Field
 Michel Habib-Deloncle
 Michel Maurice-Bokanowski
 Monique Canto-Sperber
 Nathalie Rihouet
 Olivier Guichard
 Patrice Duhamel
 Patrick Devedjian
 Paul Leroy-Beaulieu
 Paul Sérusier
 Philippe Bouvard
 Philippe Chabasse
 Pierre Bénichou
 Pierre Bonnard
 Pierre Corvol
 Pierre Émile Levasseur
 Pierre Lazareff
 Pierre Lellouche
 Pierre Louis-Dreyfus
 Pierre Manent
 Pierre Michel
 Pierre Moscovici
 Pierre-Jean Rémy
 Pierre-Oscar Lévy
 Régis Messac
 René de Obaldia
 René Ghil
 René Rémond
 Robert Aron
 Robert de Flers
 Robert Proust
 Roger Ikor
 Roger Martin du Gard
 Roger Perelman
 Roland Castro (architecte)
 Roland Moreno
 Romain Coolus
 Romain Goupil
 Romain Thomas, dit Lhéritier
 Serge Doubrovsky
 Thomas Fersen
 Tristan Bernard
 Victor Schœlcher
 William Carlos Williams

References

External links
 Official website 

 
Educational institutions established in 1803
Buildings and structures in the 9th arrondissement of Paris
1803 establishments in France